Pawnee Pass, elevation , is a mountain pass that crosses the Continental Divide in the Indian Peaks of the Rocky Mountains of Colorado in the United States. It is located near the Long Lake Trailhead in the Brainard Lake Recreation Area of the Indian Peaks Wilderness. The Pawnee Pass Trail goes up the valley through wooded terrain and makes a short climb to Lake Isabelle. The Cascade Creek Trail continues west from Pawnee Pass.

See also

Southern Rocky Mountains
Front Range
Colorado mountain passes

References

External links

Landforms of Boulder County, Colorado
Landforms of Grand County, Colorado
Mountain passes of Colorado
Great Divide of North America